Rezan Çorlu (born 7 August 1997) is a Danish professional footballer who plays as a attacking midfielder or winger for Danish 1st Division side Lyngby.

Club career

Brøndby
Born in Glostrup, Denmark to Kurdish parents from Central Anatolia, Çorlu started playing for the Brøndby youth academy at age six, where his older brother, Azad Çorlu, already played.

In June 2015, at the age of 17, Çorlu was promoted to the first team. He made his professional debut for the club a month later, on 2 July 2015, starting on the bench, but replacing Lebogang Phiri in the 63rd minute in a 9–0 win over Sammarinese club Juvenes/Dogana in the Europa League qualification. He also scored the 8th goal of the 9–0 victory, netting in the 66th minute. Çorlu made his debut in the Danish Superliga a few weeks later, on 26 July 2015, in a match against OB. Çorlu came on in the 67nd minute, replacing Andrew Hjulsager. A month later, in August 2015, he played a reserve match for Brøndby against FC Copenhagen, where he tore a ligament in his knee, keeping him out for the entirety of the 2015–16 season.

Roma
On 1 August 2017, Çorlu signed for Italian club Roma. There, he was initially placed in the under-19 team.

Loans to Lyngby
After one season in Roma without any first-team appearances, Corlu joined Danish second tier club Lyngby Boldklub on a one-year loan deal on 5 July 2018. In the 2018–19 season, he made 19 appearances and three goals as Lyngby won promotion to the Danish Superliga.

On 21 June 2019, Çorlu signed with his former club, Brøndby, and was loaned out directly to Lyngby again, who meanwhile had achieved promotion to the Danish Superliga. After an impressive first half of the 2019–20 season, Brøndby extended his contract one extra year, until 2023.

Return to Brøndby
Çorlu returned to Brøndby on 3 August 2020. He made his debut on 27 September in a 2–1 win against AC Horsens. He had an unfortunate start to his second spell with Brøndby, suffering an injury in a match against OB on 8 November which kept him sidelined for one month. Upon his return, he tested positive for SARS-CoV-2 during the COVID-19 pandemic which effectively ended his autumn season. Besides health issues, Jesper Lindstrøm had emerged as a key player in his position, keeping Çorlu on the bench.

In the pre-season friendlies, Çorlu received more playing time. However, when the season began Çorlu was mostly benched.

Return to Lyngby
On 31 August 2021, shortly before midnight on deadline day, Çorlu signed a three-year contract with Lyngby. He made his debut the following day, on 1 September, in a 5–1 win over Tårnby FF in the Danish Cup.

International career
Since his debut on 2 October 2012 for the Denmark national under-16 team in a friendly in Kladno against the Czech Republic, he gained a total of 37 caps for Danish youth national teams, in which he scored 15 goals.

Career statistics

Honours
Brøndby
Danish Superliga: 2020–21

References

External links
 
 Rezan Corlu on DBU

1997 births
Living people
Danish men's footballers
Danish expatriate men's footballers
Denmark youth international footballers
Danish people of Kurdish descent
People from Glostrup Municipality
Association football wingers
Danish Superliga players
Danish 1st Division players
Brøndby IF players
A.S. Roma players
Lyngby Boldklub players
Danish expatriate sportspeople in Italy
Expatriate footballers in Italy
Sportspeople from the Capital Region of Denmark